Ardinamir is an anchorage and small settlement on the island of Luing in Argyll and Bute, Scotland.

References 

Villages in Argyll and Bute
Villages in the Inner Hebrides
Luing